Jouett is a surname. Notable people with the name include:

Jack Jouett (1754–1822) American politician
James Edward Jouett (1826–1902), United States Navy officer
Matthew Harris Jouett (1788–1827), American painter

See also
USS Jouett, multiple ships named for the Navy officer